Happy Is the Bride is a 1958 black and white British comedy film written and directed by Roy Boulting and starring Ian Carmichael, Janette Scott, Cecil Parker, Terry-Thomas and Joyce Grenfell. It is based on the play Quiet Wedding by Esther McCracken, previously filmed in 1941.

Plot 
In a quiet summer corner of Wiltshire that is forever England, David and Janet decide to tie the knot. Unfortunately this is the cue for everyone else to take over proceedings, to the dismay of the couple and the increasing despair of Janet's father. One way or another the wedding - if there is one - is going to be an unforgettable occasion.

Cast
 Ian Carmichael as David Chaytor
 Janette Scott as Janet Royd
 Cecil Parker as Arthur Royd
 Terry-Thomas as Policeman
 Joyce Grenfell as Aunt Florence
 Eric Barker as Vicar
 Edith Sharpe as Mildred Royd
 Elvi Hale as Petula
 Miles Malleson as 1st Magistrate
 Athene Seyler as Aunt Harriet
 Irene Handl as Mme. Edna
 John Le Mesurier as Chaytor
 Thorley Walters as Jim
 Nicholas Parsons as John Royd
 Virginia Maskell as Marcia
 Brian Oulton as 2nd Magistrate
 Joan Hickson as Mrs. Bowels
 Cardew Robinson as George the Verger
 Sam Kydd as Foreman
 Arthur Mullard as a house redecorator (uncredited)

Critical reception
Leonard Maltin called the film a "mild farce"; while Bosley Crowther in The New York Times wrote, "Mr. Boulting has assembled and directed a typically fine British cast, which plays the farcical proceedings with skill and apparent enjoyment...all the characters are amusing. That's usually the way in a Boulting film."

Box office
Kinematograph Weekly listed it as being "in the money" at the British box office in 1958. It was one of the twelve most popular films of the year in Britain.

References

External links

1958 films
Films directed by Roy Boulting
1958 comedy films
British black-and-white films
1950s English-language films
British films based on plays
British comedy films
Films about weddings
Films scored by Benjamin Frankel
Films produced by Paul Soskin
Films set in Wiltshire
1950s British films